Kursav (also known as Faita or Kulsab) is a divergent and nearly extinct Madang language of the Adelbert Range of Papua New Guinea. It was once placed in the now-defunct Brahman branch of Madang. Daniels (2017) identifies Gants as its closest relative.

References

Sources
Daniels, Don. 2015. A Reconstruction of Proto-Sogeram: Phonology, Lexicon, and Morphosyntax. Doctoral dissertation, University of California at Santa Barbara.

Sogeram languages
Languages of Madang Province
Endangered Papuan languages
Severely endangered languages